Diembéring (also called Diembering, Diembéreng, Djiwat, Guimbering, Diébéring, Diebering, or Djembering) is a village in Senegal in the rural community of the same name. It is located in Cabrousse, Oussouye, Ziguinchor, Casamance, approximately 10 km north of Cap Skirring and 60 km from Ziguinchor.

It is home to the Diembéring dialect of the Kwatay language.

History
Initially, Diembéring was a fishing village. It is still so today, however tourism has opened up other possibilities.

Administration
Diembéring is the capital of the rural district (communauté rurale) of the same name. Within the district are the other villages of :

Geography
The nearest localities are Koudioundou, Nikine, Bouyouye, Cachouane, Boucotte Wolof, and Mossor.

Physical geography
Diembéring was built on sand dunes, among palm trees and large Kapok trees (known locally as Fromager trees)

Population
Diembéring is one of the few places where people speak Kuwaataay, a dialect of Jola.

Economy
The beaches of this coastal village are popular with tourists. There is a mosque in the area, as well as a church where a Jola mass is sung each Sunday. A maternity hospital is run by Spanish nuns.

See also

Bibliography

References

External links

Maps, weather and airports for Diembéring

Populated places in Ziguinchor Region
Oussouye Department